Strider Rock is a rock 1 nautical mile (1.9 km) northwest of Mount Nilsen in the Rockefeller Mountains of Edward VII Peninsula, Marie Byrd Land, West Antarctica.

Discovery and naming

Strider Rock was discovered by the 1st Byrd Antarctic Expedition in 1929. Strider Rock was named by the Advisory Committee on Antarctic Names (US-ACAN) for John P. Strider, Aviation Machinist's Mate, United States Navy, crew member on the ski-equipped R4D Skytrain in which Rear Admiral George J. Dufek made the first aircraft landing at the geographic South Pole on 31 October 1956.

References

Rock formations of Antarctica
Landforms of the Ross Dependency
King Edward VII Land